Heinz Lausch (1920–1996) was a German stage and film actor. He starred with Bruni Löbel in the 1947 rubble film comedy No Place for Love.

Selected filmography
 Young Hearts (1944)
 Kolberg (1945)
 No Place for Love (1947)
 Thank You, I'm Fine (1948)
 Once on the Rhine (1952)
 Life Begins at Seventeen (1953)
 Sun Over the Adriatic (1954)
 You Can No Longer Remain Silent (1955)
 As Long as the Roses Bloom (1956)
 Freddy, the Guitar and the Sea (1959)
 Rommel Calls Cairo (1959)

References

Bibliography
 Noack, Frank. Veit Harlan: The Life and Work of a Nazi Filmmaker. University Press of Kentucky, 2016.

External links

1920 births
1996 deaths
German male stage actors
German male television actors
German male film actors
Male actors from Berlin